Let's Go! is the second concert residency by Canadian singer Shania Twain. Performed at the Zappos Theater in Las Vegas, Nevada, the show began on December 6, 2019 and was originally estimated to run through 2021. However, due to the COVID-19 pandemic, the show was put on hold and resumed in December 2021. Previously, Twain spent two years, from December 2012 until the end of 2014, performing the Shania: Still the One residency at Caesars Palace, and embarked on her 2015 Rock This Country Tour and her 2018 Now Tour.

Background 
In March 2019, during an interview on the red carpet of the Keep Memory Alive's 'Power Of Love Gala' Twain announced the idea of a return to Las Vegas, after the end of her Now Tour in 2018. The singer watched several shows, including Gwen Stefani's Vegas performance at Zappos Theater and said: "I'll be singing somewhere, I wonder where this is going to be". During the same interview, Twain said she expected to announce the new show in June 2019.

On June 17, 2019, the singer appeared on Good Morning America to announce her second two-year Las Vegas residency, "Let's Go!". According to a press release, Twain is the creative director of the residency, which takes inspiration from her classic music videos and her 2018 tour. The residency's title is a play on the opening line of one of Twain's most famous songs, "Man! I Feel Like a Woman!"I get to settle down with a great production and have a party, so I'm gonna theme the show after a party. It's time to party!" Twain told ET Canada. Ticket sales started on June 21 at 10AM PT, though pre-sales available on June 20. Ticket prices started at $60 plus taxes and fees, and $1 from each ticket is donated to Twain's children-focused charity, Shania Kids Can.

The show will run at the Zappos Theater at Planet Hollywood Resort & Casino, and all shows will begin at 8PM. The shows are currently scheduled through December 2020. Shania Twain announced her residency is a two-year run at Good Morning America.

Following her March 14, 2020 show, further set dates were postponed until further notice due to the COVID-19 pandemic.

Set list 
This set list is representative of the show on December 6, 2019. It is not representative of all concerts for the duration of the residency.

 "Rock This Country!"
 "Love Gets Me Every Time"
 "Life's About to Get Good"
 "Up!" (Pop version)
 "Don't Be Stupid (You Know I Love You)"
 "Come on Over"
"White Christmas"
 "No One Needs to Know"
 "You're Still the One"
 "You Win My Love"
 "That Don't Impress Me Much"
 "Any Man of Mine"
 "Whose Bed Have Your Boots Been Under?"
 "Honey, I'm Home"
 "I'm Gonna Getcha Good!"
 "Party for Two"
 "Forever and for Always"
 "Swingin' with My Eyes Closed"
 "(If You're Not in It for Love) I'm Outta Here!"
 "From This Moment On"
 "Man! I Feel Like a Woman!"

Shows

Cancelled shows

References

External links 
 Shania Twain's official website
 Zappos Theater official website

See also 
 Shania: Still the One

Concert residencies in the Las Vegas Valley
2019 concert residencies
2020 concert residencies
2021 concert residencies
2022 concert residencies
Shania Twain concert tours
Music events cancelled due to the COVID-19 pandemic